The Legislative Palace of Uruguay is a monumental building, meeting place of the General Assembly of Uruguay, and the seat of the legislative branch of the Uruguayan government. It is located in the barrio of Aguada in the city of Montevideo.  

Constructed between 1904 and 1925, the building was inaugurated on August 25, 1925, in commemoration of the centenary of the Declaration of Independence. It was declared a National Historic Monument in 1975 by the government of President Juan María Bordaberry.

History 
The history of the Legislative Palace begins in 1902 with a law that approves the call for international competition for architectural projects for the construction of a new headquarters for the legislative branch, since its old headquarters, the Montevideo Cabildo, had several inadequacies. The project of the architect Vittorio Meano, who at that time was building the Palace of the Argentine National Congress in Buenos Aires, was approved, however he never found out that his project had been the winner, since he died suddenly before he could be contacted by the Legislative Palace Commission, organizer of the project competition. The construction of this building started in 1904 sponsored by the government of President José Batlle y Ordoñez.  It was designed by Italian architects Vittorio Meano and Gaetano Moretti, who planned the building's interior that is covered with marble. Among the notable contributors to the project was sculptor José Belloni, who created numerous reliefs and allegorical sculptures for the building. On August 25, 1925, the Palace was formally inaugurated. Although the decoration work was not completed until 1964. The inauguration was presided over by President José Serrato.

Source:

Architecture 
The Palace is a Greco-Roman eclecticist style building, whose facades, interior walls, vaults and columns are covered with different marbles from Uruguay, it took almost three decades to build.

It consists of three large halls and several adjoining rooms, an upper floor, where the Library of the Legislative Power works with more than 250,000 volumes  and some parliamentary offices, as well as a large basement where there are offices, warehouses and printing and binding workshops. The main facade of the building is aligned with the axis of symmetry of Libertador Avenue.

Gallery

See also 
 General Assembly of Uruguay
 Chamber of Deputies of Uruguay
 Senate of Uruguay
 Vittorio Meano

References

External links
 Official site

Seats of national legislatures
Government buildings completed in 1925
Palaces in Montevideo
Government of Uruguay
Aguada, Montevideo

Landmarks in Uruguay